"Fáze pád" is a single from the Czech pop music group Slza, from their debut studio album Katarze. The single was released on April 7, 2016. The music was created by Dalibor Cidlinský and Lukáš Bundil, written by Ondřej Ládek aka Xindl X.

Music video 
Music video was directed by Vít Karas, with Petr Lexa playing the lead. On April 17, Slza released the making of video on Facebook. In November 2018, the music video had over 12 million views on YouTube.

References 

2015 songs
2016 songs
Slza songs
Universal Music Group singles
Songs written by Xindl X